Rebecca Craig is a Scottish international lawn and indoor bowler.

Bowls career
In 2015 she won the fours gold medal and the pairs bronze medal at the Atlantic Bowls Championships.

She is also an indoor Scottish national champion.

References

Living people
Scottish female bowls players
Year of birth missing (living people)